Linda or Lynda Adams may refer to:

Linda Adams, English folk singer and founder of Fellside Records
Linda Adams, character in Escape by Night (1937 film)
Lynda Adams (1920–1997), diver

See also
Lynn Adams (disambiguation)